George Swinton Legaré (November 11, 1869 – January 31, 1913) was an American attorney and politician from South Carolina.  He was best known for his service in the United States House of Representatives from 1903 until his death.

Early life
Legaré was born in Rockville, South Carolina, the son of Edward T. and Kate (Malcolmson) Legaré.  Shortly after birth, the Legaré family moved to Charleston.  He graduated from Porter Military Academy in 1889.  Legaré studied law at the University of South Carolina for two years, then transferred to Georgetown University Law School.  He graduated from Georgetown with an LL.B. in 1893.

Career
Legaré was admitted to the bar in 1893 and commenced a legal practice in Charleston.  From 1898 to 1903, he served as Charleston's corporation counsel.  He was elected as a Democrat to the Fifty-eighth and to the four succeeding Congresses and served from March 4, 1903 until his death.  He had been reelected to the Sixty-third Congress, but died before the term started on March 4, 1913.

Death
Legaré died in St. Andrews, near Charleston on January 31, 1913.  He was buried at Magnolia Cemetery.

Family
In 1893, Legaré married Fannie Izlar, the daughter of Judge James Izlar.  They were the parents of six children, four of whom were living at the time of Legaré's death—Ferdinda, Julia, Hermina, and George.

See also
 List of United States Congress members who died in office (1900–49)

References

External links

George S. Legare, Late a Representative from South Carolina.  U.S. Government Printing Office.  1914.

1869 births
1913 deaths
Democratic Party members of the United States House of Representatives from South Carolina
Georgetown University Law Center alumni
19th-century American politicians
People from Charleston County, South Carolina
Politicians from Charleston, South Carolina
Burials at Magnolia Cemetery (Charleston, South Carolina)